Rory O'Sullivan (born 25 July 1998 in Australia) is an Australian rugby union player who plays for the  in Global Rapid Rugby and the Super Rugby AU competition. His original playing position is scrum-half. He was named in the Force squad for the Global Rapid Rugby competition in 2020.

Reference list

External links
Rugby.com.au profile
itsrugby.co.uk profile

1998 births
Australian rugby union players
Living people
Rugby union scrum-halves
Western Force players